Liliopsida Batsch (synonym: Liliatae) is a botanical name for the class containing the family Liliaceae (or Lily Family). It is considered synonymous (or nearly synonymous) with the name monocotyledon. Publication of the name is credited to Scopoli (in 1760): see author citation (botany). This name is formed by replacing the termination -aceae in the name Liliaceae by the termination -opsida (Art 16 of the ICBN).

Although in principle it is true that circumscription of this class will vary with the taxonomic system being used, in practice this name is very strongly linked to the Cronquist system, and the allied Takhtajan system. These two are the only major systems to use the name, and in both these systems it refers to the group more widely known as the monocotyledons. Earlier systems referred to this group by the name Monocotyledones, with Monocotyledoneae an earlier spelling (these names may be used in any rank).  Systems such as the Dahlgren and Thorne systems (more recent than the Takhtajan and Cronquist systems) refer to this group by the name Liliidae (a name in the rank of subclass). Modern systems, such as the APG and APG II systems refer to this group by the name monocots (a name for a clade). Therefore, in practice the name Liliopsida will almost surely refer to the usage as in the Cronquist system.

In summary the monocotyledons were named:
 Monocotyledoneae in the de Candolle system and the Engler system.
 Monocotyledones in the Bentham & Hooker system and the Wettstein system
 class Liliatae and later Liliopsida in the Takhtajan
 class Liliopsida in the Cronquist system (also in the Reveal system).
 subclass Liliidae in the Dahlgren system and the Thorne system (1992)
 clade monocots in the APG system, the APG II system and the APG III system.
Each of the systems mentioned above use their own internal taxonomy for the group.

Liliopsida in the Takhtajan system
The Takhtajan system used this internal taxonomy:

 class Liliopsida [ = monocotyledons]
 subclass Liliidae
 superorder Lilianae
 superorder Dioscoreanae
 subclass Commelinidae
 superorder Bromelianae
 superorder Pontederianae
 superorder Zingiberanae
 superorder Commelinanae
 superorder Hydatellanae
 superorder Juncanae
 superorder Poanae
 subclass Arecidae
 superorder Arecanae
 subclass Alismatidae
 superorder Alismatanae
 subclass Triurididae
 superorder Triuridanae
 subclass Aridae'
 superorder Aranae
 superorder Cyclanthanae
 superorder Pandananae
 superorder Typhanae

Liliopsida in the Cronquist system
The internal taxonomy in the Cronquist system is

 class Liliopsida [ = monocotyledons]
 subclass Alismatidae
 order Cyclanthales
 order Arales
 subclass Commelinidae
 order Commelinales
 order Eriocaulales
 order Restionales
 order Juncales
 order Cyperales
 order Hydatellales
 order Typhales
 subclass Zingiberidae
 order Bromeliales
 order Zingiberales
 subclass Liliidae
 order Liliales
 order Orchidales

Liliopsida in the Reveal system
The internal taxonomy in the  Reveal system is

 class 3. Liliopsida
 subclass 1. Alismatidae
 superorder 1. Butomanae
 superorder 2. Alismatanae
 subclass 2. Triurididae
 subclass 3. Aridae
 superorder 1. Acoranae
 superorder 2. Aranaea
 superorder 3. Cyclanthanae
 superorder 4. Pandananae
 subclass 4. Liliidae
 subclass 5. Arecidae
 superorder 1. Arecanae
 subclass 6. Commelinidae
 superorder 1. Bromelianae
 superorder 2. Pontederianae
 superorder 3. Commelinanae
 superorder 4. Hydatellanae
 superorder 5. Typhanae
 superorder 6. Juncanae
 subclass 7. Zingiberidae
 superorder 1. Zingiberanae

References

Bibliography 

  in

External links
 Liliopsida observations on iNaturalist

Liliaceae
Monocots
Plant classes